Rysensteen Gymnasium is a gymnasium (upper secondary school) in Copenhagen, Denmark

The school was established in 1881 as Laura Engelhardts Skole ("Laura Engelhardt's School") at Stormgade 16. In 1895 the school was moved to Rysensteensgade 3, and after being taken over by the Copenhagen Municipality renamed Rysensteen Gymnasium. In 1932 the school moved to Tietensgade. Around the turn of the millennium the school got new classrooms in The Brown Kødby old stables, for the subjects geography, visual arts, chemistry, biology and physics. In 2002 the main building was renovated, and in 2003 a new music room was built.

In 2011 the School chose to rent additional classrooms in The White Kødby because of space constraints, the classrooms are located 7-8 minutes by foot, from the school's main building.

Notable alumni
With graduation dates:
 1931 Kirsten Auken – medical doctor
 1944 Bodil Udsen – actress
 1955 Ester Larsen – politician
 1966 Karen Jespersen – politician
 1983 Line Barfod - politician
 1983 Naser Khader – politician
 1987 Manu Sareen - politician, writer of children's books
 1992 Iben Claces - writer

Headmasters
 1919-1931   Maria Nielsen (1882-1931)
 1931-1950   Anne Marie Bo (1885-1972)
 1950-1963   Aagot Lading (1909-1963)
 1963-1970   Svend Atke (1910-
 1970-1994   Birthe Christensen (1927-
 1994-1999   Johannes Nymark (1944-
 1.10.1999-   Gitte Harding Transbøl

External links
Rysensteen Gymnasium (in Danish)

Gymnasiums in Copenhagen
Educational institutions established in 1881
1881 establishments in Denmark